Megasurcula kurodai is an extinct species of sea snail, a marine gastropod mollusk in the family Pseudomelatomidae, the turrids and allies.

Distribution
Fossils of this marine species have been found in Middle Miocene strata in Japan.

References

 Otuka Y. (1934)，Tertiary Structure of the Northwestern End of the Kitakami Meuntainland, Iwate Prefecture, Japan, in Bull. Earthq. Res. Inst., vol. XII, pt. 3, pp. 566–638, pls. 55–51, 1 map

kurodai
Gastropods described in 1934